is an onsen located in the city of Matsumoto, Nagano Prefecture, Japan.

The Asama Hot Spring Center, also known as the Hot Plaza Hall, has a configuration typical of many Japanese onsen with separate areas for males and females; each area contains multiple indoor pools, saunas and two outdoor pools, one hot and one cold. The published temperature range of this onsen is 42-47 degrees Celsius.

Between 1969 and 2011, Asama Onsen included an open-air speed skating rink.

References

External links
Guide to Asama Onsen by  
Asama-onsen Hot Spring, by JNTO 
Outline of Asama Onsen, by the  
Asama Hot Spring - Hot Plaza Asama by the City of Matsumoto

Hot springs of Nagano Prefecture
Speed skating venues in Japan